"Malagueña" (from Málaga) is a song by Cuban composer Ernesto Lecuona. It was originally the sixth movement of Lecuona's Suite Andalucía (1933), to which he added lyrics in Spanish. The song has since become a popular, jazz, marching band, and drum and bugle corps standard and has been provided with lyrics in several languages. In general terms Malagueñas are flamenco dance styles from Málaga in the southeast of Spain (see Malagueñas (flamenco style)).

Origins
The melody that forms the basis of "Malagueña" was not of Lecuona's invention.  It can be heard in 19th century American composer Louis Moreau Gottschalk's solo piano composition "Souvenirs d'Andalousie."  Based on Gottschalk's international renown, it is reasonable to assume Lecuona heard it and either wittingly or unwittingly co-opted it in composing his most famous piece.  Further research is required to determine if Gottschalk's composition and the melody popularized as "Malagueña" is itself based on a folkloric Spanish tune.

Notable vocal performances

A German-language version, sung by Caterina Valente, with Werner Müller's Orchestra, was very popular in the United States (not making the Billboard chart, but charting on Cash Box, peaking at position #42) in February 1955. Caterina also sang "Malagueña" in Spanish. English lyrics were written by Marian Banks and a later charting version was recorded by Connie Francis in 1960 that reached #42 on Billboard's chart as the flip side of her #1 pop hit "My Heart Has a Mind of Its Own".

In 1962, Violetta Villas recorded Malagueña in German- and Polish-language versions. Singers Vigen Derderian and Googoosh adapted the song for Iranian pop style.

Notable instrumental performances

Lecuona's "Malagueña" was recorded by the composer as a piano solo on the 1955 RCA Victor LP Lecuona Plays Lecuona.  The recording is available on RCA/BMG CD compilations / reissues.

As a pianist, Stan Kenton first had the piece arranged for the Sketches on Standards LP in 1956, which mostly went unnoticed at that time.  After the 1960 Connie Francis version, Bill Holman's 1961 arrangement for the Stan Kenton Orchestra re-imagined the song again as a fiery big band showpiece, with an even larger orchestra. Performances of this arrangement appeared on Kenton's 1962 Grammy Award-winning album Adventures In Jazz and on the 1962 American TV show Jazz Scene USA.

Marco Rizo's solo piano performance of "Malagueña" can be found in Lecuona, a Musical Legacy. Rizo, who in 1938 became the official pianist of the Havana Philharmonic, performed under the direction of Maestro Ernesto Lecuona and gave duo piano recitals with Lecuona in 1939.

Sabicas adapted it for flamenco style guitar, and it was included on his 1957 album, Sabicas Vol. 2 on the Elektra label. This recording was influential in the piece becoming a guitar standard, even though it was originally written for piano.

An acoustic instrumental demo of "Malagueña" was performed by Ritchie Valens and recorded in early 1959 at his manager Bob Keane's home studio.  It was to have been worked on and completed later that year, but Valens died in a plane crash on February 3 before anything further could be done.  About two years later, Keane chose Valens' demo as one of several unfinished tracks featured on the album Ritchie Valens In Concert at Pacoima Jr. High. Other artists as varied as Chet Atkins, Count Basie, Roy Clark, Ray Conniff, Xavier Cugat, Esquivel, Connie Francis, Ted Heath and Chico O'Farrill also performed the piece.

Other popular versions
Another version in the pop music scene is that of Puerto Rican virtuoso guitarist José Feliciano as part of his 1969 Gold record Alive Alive O!. He performed his particular arrangement live many times over decades. American guitarist Roy Clark recorded an instrumental version of "Malagueña" and also performed the song in an episode of the US TV show The Odd Couple. Clark went on to close his shows with the song on a 12-string acoustic guitar for many years afterward.

In 1973 Hans Vermeulen, leader of Dutch pop band Sandy Coast, produced a version by Los Angeles, which made it to the top 3 of the Dutch charts.

The piece has become a favorite in the sport of figure skating, used notably by Kristi Yamaguchi for her gold medal-winning program at the 1992 Winter Olympics and World Championships, and more recently by world champion Javier Fernández, who used the piece for his short program during the 2015–16 and 2016–17 seasons. The score for the program consisted of an instrumental solo guitar section performed by Paco de Lucía, and a vocal section sung by Plácido Domingo. The program was choreographed by Antonio Najarro, director of Spain's National Ballet. Pair figure skaters Aleksandra Boikova and Dmitrii Kozlovskii also used the piece as their free program music for the 2021-2022 Olympic season.

Drum corps, marching band
"Malagueña" is often performed in drum and bugle corps and marching competitions. "Malagueña" has been performed and recorded numerous times by both the University of Massachusetts Minuteman Marching Band and the University of Minnesota Marching Band, and as such, has become one of the songs most identified with both groups. One of the most memorable drum and bugle corps performances was by the Madison Scouts Drum and Bugle Corps in 1988, which earned them the Drum Corps International (DCI) championship title (the group played the song other years, as well, both before and after 1988). A non-jazz arrangement was played by another top drum and bugle corps in 1988, the Velvet Knights of Anaheim, CA. This has continued to be a fan favorite of drum and bugle corps.

References

External links
ASCAP: Malagueña (From Spanish Suite "Andalucia")
List of recordings of the song

Songs with music by Ernesto Lecuona
Connie Francis songs
Bill Haley songs
Caterina Valente songs
Spanish-language songs